Max Meth (25 February 1900 – 3 January 1984) was an Austrian-American Broadway musical director and conductor for over 40 years (1927–1968). He came to the United States from Austria. He won the Tony Award twice, in 1949 for the original As the Girls Go, and in 1952 for a revival of Pal Joey.

Broadway credits
 Artists and Models  Nov 15, 1927 – Mar 24, 1928
 The Greenwich Village Follies  Apr 9, 1928 – July 28, 1928
 A Night in Venice   May 21, 1929 – Oct 19, 1929
 Nina Rosa  Sep 20, 1930 – Jan 17, 1931
 The New Yorkers   Dec 8, 1930 – May 2, 1931
 Ballyhoo of 1932  Sep 6, 1932 – Nov 26, 1932
 Take a Chance  Nov 26, 1932 – July 1, 1933
 Roberta Nov 18, 1933 – July 21, 1934
 Say When  Nov 8, 1934 – Jan 12, 1935
 Revenge with Music  Nov 28, 1934 – May 27, 1935
 Parade May 20, 1935 – June 22, 1935
 Right This Way  Jan 5, 1938 – Jan 15, 1938
 Sing Out the News  Sep 24, 1938 - Jan 7, 1939
 Leave It to Me!  - Replacement Nov 9, 1938 – July 15, 1939
 Cabin in the Sky Oct 25, 1940 – Mar 8, 1941
 Let's Face It!  Oct 29, 1941 – Mar 20, 1943
 Jackpot  Jan 13, 1944 – Mar 11, 1944
 Dream With Music  May 18, 1944 – June 10, 1944
 Up in Central Park  Jan 27, 1945 – Apr 13, 1946
 Beggar's Holiday  Dec 26, 1946 – Mar 29, 1947
 Finian's Rainbow  – Replacement Jan 10, 1947 – Oct 2, 1948
 As the Girls Go  Nov 13, 1948 – Jan 14, 1950
 Great to Be Alive!  Mar 23, 1950 – May 6, 1950
 Pal Joey  (Revival) Jan 3, 1952 – Apr 18, 1953
 Seventh Heaven May 26, 1955 – July 2, 1955
 Ziegfeld Follies of 1957  Mar 1, 1957 – Jun 15, 1957
 Finian's Rainbow  (Revival) May 23, 1960 – June 1, 1960
 The Unsinkable Molly Brown  - Replacement Nov 3, 1960 – Feb 10, 1962
 The Megilla of Itzik Manger  Oct 9, 1968 – Dec 15, 1968

Awards
 1949 Tony Award for Best Conductor and Musical Director – As the Girls Go (winner)
 1952 Tony Award for Best Conductor and Musical Director – Pal Joey (winner)

References

External links

American male conductors (music)
Music directors
Tony Award winners
1900 births
1984 deaths
20th-century American conductors (music)
Austrian emigrants to the United States
20th-century American male musicians